The 2019 Castle Point Borough Council election took place on 2 May 2019 to elect members of Castle Point Borough Council in England.

Results summary

Ward results

Appleton

Boyce

Canvey Island Central

Canvey Island East

Canvey Island North

Canvey Island South

Canvey Island West

Canvey Island Winter Gardens

Cedar Hall

St. George's

St. James

St. Mary's

St. Peter's

Victoria

References

Castle Point Borough Council elections
2019 English local elections